The 1946 Sydney to Hobart Yacht Race was the second annual running of the "blue water classic" Sydney to Hobart Yacht Race. It was hosted by the Cruising Yacht Club of Australia based in Sydney.

The inaugural race in 1945 had been planned as a cruise, and no thoughts were given to repeating the event. However it became a race at the suggestion of visiting Royal Navy captain John Illingworth, and the race proved so popular a repeat was planned.

The second race began on Sydney Harbour, at noon on Boxing Day (26 December 1946), before heading south for 630 nautical miles (1,170 km) through the Tasman Sea, past Bass Strait, into Storm Bay and up the Derwent River, to cross the finish line in Hobart, Tasmania.

The 1946 expanded fleet comprised more than double the vessels of the inaugural event with 19 starters. Of the 19 starters, 8 yachts were forced to retire, and the remaining 11 made it successfully to Hobart, with Morna  captained by Claude Plowman winning line honours, and Christina captained by JR Bull taking handicap honours on adjusted time.

1946 fleet
19 yachts registered to begin the 1946 Sydney to Hobart Yacht Race. They were:

Results

References

See also
 Sydney to Hobart Yacht Race

Sydney to Hobart Yacht Race
S
1946 in Australian sport
December 1946 sports events in Australia
January 1947 sports events in Australia